The 2018–19 Super Ligue is the 49nd season (since independence) of the Super Ligue, the top-tier football league in Niger. The season started on 28 December 2018.

Standings
Final table.

  1.AS SONIDEP (Niamey)               26  17  7  2  37-13  58       Champions
  2.AS Police (Niamey)                26  15  7  4  38-21  52
  3.AS GNN (Niamey)                   26  12  8  6  33-24  44
  4.AS FAN (Niamey)                   26  11  8  7  30-21  41
  5.Sahel SC (Niamey)                 26  10 11  5  35-28  41
  6.US Gendarmerie Nationale (Niamey) 26  10  5 11  27-27  35
  7.ASN NIGELEC (Niamey)              26   7 11  8  32-20  32
  8.AS Racing FC de Boukoki (Niamey)  26   7 10  9  27-34  31
  9.AS Douanes (Niamey)               26   6 10 10  20-20  28
 10.Jangorzo FC (Maradi)              26   7  7 12  25-38  28
 11.Espoir FC (Zinder)                26   7  6 13  19-46  27
 12.Urana FC (Arlit)                  26   4 12 10  23-27  24
 ------------------------------------------------------------
 13.JS Tahoua FC                      26   5  9 12  23-36  24       Relegated
 14.Akokana FC (Arlit)                26   3 11 12  15-29  20       Relegated

References

Super Ligue (Niger) seasons
Premier League
Premier League
Niger